Yanghe Stadium is a multi-use stadium in Chongqing, People's Republic of China.  It is currently used mostly for football matches.  The stadium holds 32,000 people, and is the home of Chongqing Lifan in the Chinese Super League.

The stadium was purchased by the Lifan Group in 2001 for 80 million RMB and immediately replaced Datianwan Stadium as the home group for Chongqing Lifan.

External links
Stadium info at www.fussballtempel.net

Jiangbei District, Chongqing
Football venues in Chongqing
Sports venues in Chongqing